Hagen Inc. (officially The Rolf C. Hagen Group of Companies) is a pet supplies company headquartered in Montreal, Quebec, Canada and founded in 1955 by Rolf C. Hagen with the help of his brothers, Dieter and Horst.  Dieter and Horst Hagen joined the company later after immigrating from Germany, becoming key members of the firm.

History
Rolf C. Hagen began acquiring bird seeds from the prairies in Western Canada with the intention of exporting it back to Germany, where he had established contacts.  This was the initial stage of his new venture before expanding his business into a diverse pet supplies manufacturer. During the past fifty years, the Hagen Group of Companies was able to export its business from Canada to the international market.  Its customers include small and local pet stores in Canada and the United States, as well as publicly owned "box stores" such as Petsmart and Petco.  

Hagen wholly owns subsidiaries in the United States, England, France, Germany and Malaysia. The Hagen Group of Companies consist of Hagen Industries (also in Montreal) and Hagen Pet Foods Inc.  Hagen Pet Foods Inc. is based in Montreal, Quebec, Canada, where the Nutrience line of premium dog food is produced.

Hagen manufactures products related to pets and has created a popular line of aquarium filtration for enthusiasts and professionals. The firm's recent business restructuring phase resulted in direct shipment of its products to independent dealers instead of through traditional two-step distribution.

Its global head office is located in Montreal, Quebec, Canada, and was completed in June 2006.

Rolf C. Hagen died of a heart attack on 22 October 2011.

Hagen closed the Edmonton, Alberta warehouse. In Sept 2014, they opened a distribution center (3rd party logistics) in Calgary and still maintain a small office in Edmonton for order control and Western distribution control.

The crab Geosesarma hagen is named after the company, because of the company's support of Christoph D. Schubart and Christian Lukhaup. G. hagen is a popular crab in the aquarium trade, where it was traded long before it was scientifically described.

Exo-Terra
Hagen's Exo-Terra creates terrariums for reptiles, amphibians and invertebrates. Their division sponsors an annual two-week expedition to Africa.  The Exo-Terra Expedition explores the natural habitats of reptiles, and has even discovered a species of gecko, Phelsuma vanheygeni. The company holds an annual Nactus Award reptile photography contest that awards hobbyists a place on the expedition.

References

External links
 
Hagen industries official website Logistics Today
2006 Industry Recognition Awards - Rolf C. Hagen's Exo Terra Worm Dish
Global Pet Expo 2007 Best New Product Showcase Winners - Several awards for Hagen
Global Pet Expo 2006 Best New Product Winners - One award for Hagen
APPMA and PIDA Announce 2005 Global Pet Expo New Product Showcase Winners - One award for Hagen

See also 
Eheim
Fish food
Burgham Sales
Freedom Pet

1955 establishments in Quebec
Animal food manufacturers
Companies based in Montreal
Manufacturing companies established in 1955
Fishkeeping
Canadian companies established in 1955